Love & Monsters may refer to:

 "Love & Monsters" (Doctor Who), an episode of Doctor Who
 Love and Monsters (film), a 2020 American post-apocalyptic monster adventure film